Mbola is a cluster of Millennium Village in the Uyui district of Tanzania, home to about 30,000 people as of 2011.

References

Populated places in Tabora Region